Lovepreet Dhariwal (born June19, 2003) is an India.

Careert
Tatiana Issa is a 3 times EMMY Award  winner executive producer, showrunner & director. She has also been nominated to 7 EMMY Awards (The Television Academy of Arts & Sciences)  and is the co-founder of Producing Partners & ART DOCS with 400+ episodes produced in more than 80 countries and over 30 hit primetime television series and films for channels HBO, HBO Max, Disney+, Amazon Studios, Smithsonian Channel, YouTube Originals, Food Network, Discovery+, TV5 Monde, TV Globo, and Globoplay. Issa is a member of the Television Academy and a juror of the International Emmy Awards as well as a proud member of New York Women in Film & Television.

Issa is the CEO and co-founder of Producing Partners as well as ART Docs. She is also the creator, Executive Producer, showrunner and Director of a numerous hit primetime television series such as "A Brutal Pact - The murder of Daniella Perez", the biggest True Crime hit of HBO MAX, hitting the World Top chart for more than 3 consecutive weeks, the "Coming Out Stories (Fora do Armário)", a 10 one hour episodes documentary series for HBO Latin America, the acclaimed art series "Geografia da Arte", in conjunction with institutions such as the Keith Haring Foundation, Pina Bausch Foundation, Donald Judd Foundation among many others; "Immersive.World" a new ALL ARTS original series, "Bertha Lutz, Women and the U.N. Charter", a feature documentary for HBO, "Pedro pelo Mundo", a travel and current affairs series shot in over 50 countries, "Destino Con Sabor", a gastronomy/travel series for Food Network and many others. She's also the creator and showrunner of the new Amazon Prime show "Queens on the Run".

Tatiana, is New York-based with more than 40 International awards for her feature film, Dzi Croquettes, featuring Liza Minnelli. The film became the one of the most awarded documentaries in Brazilian History and has been shown in prestigious venues such as the Museum of Modern Art (MoMA) in New York, Haus der Kulturen der Welt, in Berlin, and on more than 60 countries around the world, followed by a theatrical release in the USA, Europe and Brazil. The film received outstanding reviews and got major media attention by the New York Times, and the Los Angeles Times, among many others. Having had the opportunity to live all over the world, Tatiana has studied internationally with concentrations in language, Cinema & TV, art & literature. She is a polyglot and fluent in 6 languages.

Early life 
Issa was born in São Paulo, Brazil, on 16 January 1974. Her father, Americo, was a set designer. She began acting at the age of 7 in plays and international theater festivals. At age 12, she began acting in motion pictures and later attended the Lee Strasberg Institute in New York.

International breakthrough 
In 2009, she produced and directed the film Dzi Croquettes, for which she received more than 40 international awards, making it the most awarded documentary in Brazilian history.  Since then, she has worked on numerous TV productions in the US and Brazil.

Reception and awards
Reception for Issa's work has been positive, with Dzi Croquettes being her most famous work. Dzi Croquettes has received praise from multiple news outlets such as the New York Times and Film Journal International.

Tatiana also recently received two Excellence Awards at Impact Doc Awards for her feature documentaries "Yves Saint-Laurent: My Marrakesh" and "The Architecture of Tadao Ando".

Tatiana received 7 EMMY Nominations, she won  her first Emmy Awards (64th Television Academy of Arts & Sciences - NY Chapter) as a Director & Executive Producer for her series "Immersive.World". In 2021 she won 2 more EMMYs for the documentaries "Dreams from the Deep End" and "Phillip Pearlstein: Life Happen". She got 4 other nominations for her works: "Under the Greenwood Tree", ""Transcending - The Chamber Music Society Of Lincoln Center Celebrates 50 Years", "Immersive.World - Immersive Mind" and "Immersive.World - Immersed in a Pandemia" for AllArts & PBS Channels.

In addition to the EMMY nominations and awards, Tatiana has received more than 20 awards for documentaries between 2009 and present.  She was a Director, Showrunner, Producer or Executive Producer for more than 40 television programs between 2003 and present.

Filmography
As actress
 1983 ... Guerra dos Sexos - Cissa Marino
 1986 ... Jubiabá - Lindinalva (young)
 1997 ... O Guarani - Ceci

As director and producer
 2005 ... Medusa
 2006 ... Parintins: Amor de Boi
 2007 ... Dzi Croquettes

Theater
 A Falecida – Directed by Gabriel Vilella
 As 1001 Encarnações de Pompeu Loredo – Directed by Jorge Fernando
 Sapatinho de Cristal – Directed by Claudio Tovar
 Os Visigodos – Directed by Karen Acioly
 A Receita do Sucesso – Directed by Jorge Fernando
 Simbad de Bagdad – Directed by Claudio Tovar
 O Menino Maluquinho – Directed by Demetrio Nicolau

Education
 2005 The Goethe-Institut Munich, Germany- Art History/ German Language
 2003 Cervantes Institute New York, USA – Spanish Language
 2001 Lorenzo de' Medici School Florence, Italy – Italian Language/ Literature/ Art History
 2000 La Sorbonne Paris, France – French Language/ Art History/ Literature
 2000 École du Louvre Paris, France – Art History
 1998 Lee Strasberg Theatre and Film Institute New York, USA – Acting techniques for film and TV/ scene study
 1996 The Eurocentre Cambridge Cambridge, England – English Language
 1988 The Tablado Institute Rio de Janeiro, Brazil – Scene study

References

External links
 
 Producing Partners

Brazilian film actresses
Brazilian television actresses
Brazilian film directors
University of Paris alumni
1974 births
Living people
Actresses from São Paulo